Ficus reflexa  is a species of flowering plant in the family of Moraceae, native to some islands in the Indian Ocean.

It is found in Madagascar, Comoros, Réunion, Mauritius and Seychelles.

References

External links

reflexa